Doans is an unincorporated community in Taylor Township, Greene County, in the U.S. state of Indiana.

History
Doans took its name form Doans Creek. A post office was established at Doans in 1899, and remained in operation until it was discontinued in 1971.

Geography

References

Unincorporated communities in Greene County, Indiana
Unincorporated communities in Indiana